The automotive industry in the Philippines is the 9th largest in the Asia-Pacific region, with approximately 273.4 thousand vehicles sold in 2019. Most of the vehicles sold and built in the Philippines are from foreign brands. For the most part, the Philippines is dominated by Japanese automobile manufacturers like most of its ASEAN neighbors. The automobile production in the country is covered under the Philippine Motor Vehicle Development Program implemented by the Board of Investments. In addition, there are also a small number of independent firms who assemble and fabricate jeepneys and other similar vehicles, using surplus engines and drivetrain parts mostly from Japan.

The Philippine automobile industry consists of two sectors: motor vehicle assembly and vehicle parts and components manufacturing. The country also has an active premium car market and commercial vehicle segment.

Automobile sales in the Philippines mostly consist of locally assembled and imported cars, notably coming from Thailand, Indonesia, and from other countries. In 2019, an imported vehicle coming from Indonesia costed 24 percent lower than a locally made equivalent. The same cost difference applies to completely built-up cars from South Korea (also 24 percent) and Thailand, with 18 percent. The country also imports cars from China, India, and the United States.

History
The Philippines' automobile industry started during the American colonial period from 1898 to 1946. Filipinos were used to riding animal-pulled vehicles, and wealthy citizens were initially the ones who could afford to buy and own these newly introduced automobiles. Back in those days, on average, it took at least three months to ship an automobile from Europe or the United States, to Manila.

Cars and motorcycles were introduced and made available in the country by trading companies as early as 1901, with Dr. Juan Miciano, being acknowledged as the first Filipino to buy and operate a motor vehicle. He drove a French-made Richard-Brasier in which he bought back in 1901, according to a 1910 motor car directory. Although prior to that, back in December 1900, the US Army Signal Corps had brought in a number of electric cars by Woods Motor Vehicle Company into the country for military use only. It marked the early appearance of motor cars in the country.

In the early days of the Filipino automobile market, American-made cars from Mercury, Buick, Chevrolet, Ford, and Dodge have dominated the car market from the 1920s all the way to the early 1970s. And the country pioneered the establishment of the automotive assembly in the Southeast Asian region. An import substitution policy was developed for the 1950s, which led to the prohibition of and then punishingly high tariffs on the import of fully built-up cars from 1951 until 1972.

American and European-made cars were a common sight on the country's road by the 1960s. In that same decade, Japanese-made cars were introduced in the market. The country's auto industry was on the number one spot in the entirety of Southeast Asia during that period. By the mid-1960s, fuel economy and practicality began to become important criteria for a growing number of car buyers in the country. The Japanese car manufacturers were at the forefront of cars that feature fuel economy and practicality. At this point, American car manufacturers like General Motors turned to their European and Australian subsidiaries Vauxhall and Holden, to bring in the mid-size and compact cars to compete against Japanese marques in the growing car market.

Localization
In the 1970s, local production of automobiles in the Philippines began in 1975 with mostly passenger and some commercial vehicles. During the 1973 oil crisis, then President Ferdinand Marcos advised Filipinos to buy smaller, more efficient vehicles with four-cylinder engines. In which demand for full-size American sedans fell in favor of economical, reliable, affordable, small, and practical cars. By the mid-70s, the popularity of full-sized American cars had quickly dwindled and the compact, subcompact, and some mid-sized cars have quickly become popular ever since then.

In 1973, the government instituted the Progressive Car Manufacturing Program (PCMP), a system with scheduled increases in local parts content requirement which also allowed program participants to import a certain proportion of completely built-up vehicles. The original participants were General Motors, Ford, PAMCOR (a Chrysler/Mitsubishi joint venture), Delta Motors Corporation (Toyota), and DMG Motors (Volkswagen). A local Volkswagen assembler, DMG, attempted to build a native national car, the Volkswagen Sakbayan (a portmanteau of sasakyang katutubong bayan, "original national vehicle") as well as the Trakbayan light truck. This project, however, did not last long. The Sakbayan was based on the Volkswagen Country Buggy.

During the 1980s, the mid-size, compact, and subcompact Japanese and some European cars became dominated the Philippine market. However, by 1985, several car manufacturers closed and left the Philippine market, leaving Nissan and Mitsubishi in the market. By 1985, due to economic downturn, cars like the Nissan Stanza and Mitsubishi Lancer were the only choice left for car buyers, while most people drove older cars, resulting in the drastic fall of the local auto industry, an industry which was once known as the leading automotive industry in the 1960s in Southeast Asia. In this era, Thailand would gain a reputation as the "Detroit of Southeast Asia", with their industry currently ranking 12th in the whole world and 1st in Southeast Asia. Towards the end of the '80s, some car manufacturers including Mitsubishi, Nissan, and Toyota, resumed business operations in the Philippines. With the recovery of the country's economy from the 1980s until the mid-1990s, the automotive industry in the Philippines recovered with local vehicle manufacturers hitting 138,000 units in 1996. This figure is 85 percent of the domestic vehicle sales of the period.

After Marcos
The original PCMP (Toyota, Mitsubishi, Nissan) members returned in 1988 after the People Power Revolution ousted Marcos in 1986, and eventually, no less than thirteen manufacturers vied for a market limited to around 100,000 cars per year. During the 1997 Asian financial crisis, several makers withdrew as sales declined, becoming de facto CBU importers rather than assemblers. Since 1998 the Philippine automotive manufacturing policy has been in flux, severely undermined by the preponderance of lightly used cars from Japan and South Korea. A new tax reform program in 2002 actually undermined any local assembly by lowering the sales tax on the cheapest microcars sold in the country, most of which were imported from other ASEAN countries or China. Meanwhile, the popular locally assembled AUVs with high Philippine parts content were hit with considerable sales tax increases due to their bigger engines and higher up-front prices.

The total industry sales plummeted anew to five digits annually from 1998 to 2006. It was only in 2007 onwards the automobile industry sales begin to climb to pre-crisis levels, where the total industry sales reached 144,435 units. Production of completely knocked down cars remained stagnant after the 1997–1998 economic crisis, and since 2008, CBU imports outnumbered the locally assembled cars.

The 2010s were seen as a great decade for the automobile industry in the country, with new car brands and vehicle models arriving for the local market. From 2015 onwards, the country's automobile market has been progressing. The automobile industry in the Philippines has struggled due to the COVID-19 pandemic. Even before the pandemic, sales were greatly affected due to the 2020 Taal Volcano eruption. Although sales are recovering, the local automobile industry's monthly average sales performance is still way below the figures.

Government programs

Progressive Car Manufacturing Program (PCMP)

In 1973, President Ferdinand Marcos signed the Progressive Car Manufacturing Program (PCMP). Originally 4 car manufacturers were chosen to be part of the program, but Ford Motor Company was determined not to be left out. Ford proposed to the government that, if included, Ford would provide a stamping plant. After an 11-hour proposal, the deal was settled and PCMP ended being a five-participant venture. The program consisted of Delta Motors Corporation/Toyota, General Motors Pilipinas, Ford Philippines, DMG/Volkswagen, and Chrysler Philippines- a joint venture of Mitsubishi and Chrysler.

The first Asian Utility Vehicles (AUV, local versions of the Basic Utility Vehicle project then in vogue) was made with full manufacturing and assembly capabilities, each of the five PCMP participants was spurred to produce vehicles completely from local materials, designed for local needs. In terms of design, all AUV's body parts were flat stamped (no compound curves) which require a minimum investment in tooling and simplifying repairs. The most successful of the AUV's in the country were the Toyota Tamaraw and Ford Fiera. From the chassis cab, Ford and Toyota designed numerous body styles for specific uses for small businesses such as farmers and fishermen. Affordability was a target for all AUV's. To solve this, Ford prepared project studies for varied uses. They had a financial arrangement with Citibank to give additional consideration if the applicant would follow the project study.

The other remaining 3 car manufacturers that are also part of the PCMP Program made their own AUV to compete with the local market, it included the Mitsubishi Cimmaron (which was largely replaced by the Mitsubishi L300 in the Philippines), DMG/Volkswagen Sakbayan, GM Harabas, Isuzu KC20 and Nissan Bida. Initially, the Bida was going to be a fourth-generation Ford Fiera, but as a result of Ford leaving the market in 1984, Nissan bought the rights to the Fiera and sold it as a Nissan. Delta/Toyota also developed a local SUV mainly for military use, the Delta Mini Cruiser. After the early 1980s financial collapse, 2 out of 5 of the PCMP members withdrew, leaving only Nissan and Mitsubishi. The program was considered to be a failure, as stated by the then prime minister of the Philippines, Cesar Virata. He also admitted that since 1975, not one of the five participants in the PCMP had produced a car that could be considered "Made in the Philippines." For example,the Ford Fiera, was assembled at Ford Lio Ho Motor in Taiwan, while the Toyota Tamaraw was known for its Indonesian origin.

Car Development Program (CDP)

In 1987, PCMP was replaced by the new "Car Development Program" (CDP), with lower local parts requirements. The original participants of the program were Mitsubishi, Nissan, and Toyota, when they went back into business in 1988. This program made car manufacturers to build up local assembly plants. In 1990, the addition of the People's Car Program to the CDP paved the way for the entry of new car manufacturers such as Honda, Kia, and Fiat. Honda, Kia Motors, Fiat, and later Proton built assembly plants in the country, which saw Honda assembling the Accord, Civic, and CR-V , Fiat assembling the Fiat Uno, Kia assembling the Kia Pride, and Proton assembling the Wira as well as a couple of Volkswagen vehicles for the local market. A Luxury Car Program was also added in 1992 as part of the CDP amendment. It saw the entry of Volvo, BMW, and the re-introduction of Mercedes-Benz. Volvo 850s and the BMW 3 Series (E36) were assembled in the country for a time in the form of semi-knocked down kits.

Public Utility Vehicle Modernization Program (PUVMP)

The Public Utility Vehicle Modernization Program was launched by the Department of Transportation of the Philippines in 2017, with the goal of making the country's public transportation system efficient and environmentally friendly by 2020. The program features ten components which include regulatory reform, route planning, route rationalization, fleet modernization, industry consolidation, financing, pilot implementation, stakeholder support mechanism, and communication. The program calls for the phasing-out of jeepneys, buses, and other public utility vehicles (PUVs) that are at least 15 years old and replacing them with safer, more comfortable, and more environmentally-friendly alternatives over the next three years. Manufacturers like Hyundai, Isuzu, Hino, Mitsubishi Fuso, Mahindra and Russian brand GAZ have participated to build modern PUVs based on their existing van, truck and bus lineups to replace the aging Jeepney.

Comprehensive Automotive Resurgence Strategy (CARS) program

The CARS Program was implemented by the Department of Trade and Industry in order to attract and encourage new car companies to produce vehicles in the Philippines and stimulate demand and impose industry regulations that will restore the country's automotive industry, and make the country a regional automotive manufacturing hub, and creating more jobs in the country.

The program was considered unsuccessful since most car manufacturers see the Philippines as a market of vehicle importer rather than an exporter. Most car manufacturers would build assembly plants in Thailand, Indonesia, Malaysia, Vietnam, and China since their corporate taxes, operations setup and costs are lower. There are more major parts suppliers that have set up facilities in these countries, meaning importing parts is not needed. Other factors include minimum wages and electricity costs, which are also slightly lower compared to the Philippines.

So far, only two Japanese car manufacturers, Mitsubishi and Toyota, have taken part in the program. The program initially had the capacity for three car manufacturers, but no other automaker has participated to take up the third position. Mitsubishi was approved by the government under the CARS program in 2016 and announced the local production of the Mirage and Mirage G4 in 2017. Toyota Motor Philippines has been manufacturing the Toyota Vios since 2013 and enrolled the facelifted Yaris ATIV-based Vios to be locally manufactured. Both manufacturers have a target to produce 200,000 vehicles within 6 years.

Price differences on imported cars coming from Indonesia or Thailand have been reported to be much lower compared to a locally assembled car. This is because the country does not impose tax incentives on imported cars. Unlike Thailand, it has preserved its automobile industry by giving an advantage with tax incentives on the locally-made vehicles, meaning 4 out of every 5 cars sold are complete built-up (CBU) imports and only about 1% of vehicles are locally assembled. This resulted in the closing of assembly plants of Ford in 2012, Honda in 2020, and Nissan in 2021, while Isuzu decided to stop local production of the Isuzu D-Max in 2019 meaning cars from their lineup will be imported from elsewhere.

Safeguard Measures Act 
In 2021, the Department of Trade and Industry has enacted laws on import safeguards on automobiles in a bid to protect the domestic automobile business. This was made as a response to the petition filed by Philippine Metal Workers Alliance asking for safeguard measures against the dominance of fully imported automobiles versus locally assembled models. Many car manufacturers, have shown concern that the import tariffs would hurt the local car industry as they rely heavily on imported cars from other countries such as Indonesia and Thailand. Although vehicles that are exempt to this rule are vans/commercial vehicles that have more than 10-seating capacity, electric vehicles, locally assembled vehicles, and most luxury cars. DTI Secretary Ramon Lopez announced that the country would start imposing a 70,000 PHP ($1,460) tariff on passenger cars and 110,000 PHP ($2,262) on light commercial vehicles. Cars coming from Thailand, USA, Japan, and Europe are subject to this rule. Though some countries like the People's Republic of China, South Korea, Malaysia, and partially Indonesia are exempted from this rule.

However, on August 6, 2021, the imposition of safeguard duty on imported vehicles was suspended. As the Tariff Commission determined that there is no surge on fully imported vehicles. Given that completely-built passenger cars and light commercial vehicles were not imported in greater quantities during the investigation period, the Commission closes its formal investigation and recommends that no safeguard measure be imposed on imports of the CBU passenger cars and light commercial vehicles under examination will not face any definitive general safeguard measures. Once the order is published, it will be transmitted to the Department of Finance, which will then direct the Bureau of Customs to lift the DTI's safeguard measures. The decision to lift the DTI's safeguard restrictions on imported cars, which account for the vast majority of vehicles sold in the Philippines, will significantly help the industry recover. While the implementation is waiting for a full effect, car dealerships across the country will return cash deposits paid by consumers who purchased the imported vehicles during that time period.

Active manufacturers

Notable Filipino automotive manufacturers include Sarao Motors and Francisco Motors Corporation.

 there are 58 official car brands in the country.

BMW

Between 1994 and 1997, the BMW 3 Series (E36) was assembled locally in the form of SKD kits. BMW Philippines is currently an owned subsidiary of San Miguel Corporation, and the official importer and distributor of BMW vehicles in the country.

Ford

Ford's history in the Philippines can be traced back to 1929. Ford Philippines, Inc. (FPI) was established as a subsidiary of the Ford Motor Company in 1967 and began production operations on May 3, 1968. Ford left the market in 1984 due to the local economic recession. The brand came back in 1997 as Ford Motor Company Philippines, Inc. (FMCPI). Ford built a manufacturing plant that opened in September 1999. During its lifetime, the plant produced both Ford and Mazda products like the Ford Lynx, Ford Escape/Mazda Tribute, Ford Focus, Mazda3, and the Mazda-based Ford Ranger not only for the local market but also neighboring countries such as Indonesia, Vietnam, Thailand, Malaysia, and Singapore. The plant closed down in 2012. Since then, Ford Philippines imports the vehicles it sells mostly coming from Thailand and the United States to the Philippine market. Ford Philippines also used to sell Lincoln cars in the country. Their former plant in Santa Rosa, Laguna is now owned by Mitsubishi Motors Philippines.

General Motors

Chevrolet’s operation in the country is currently under the control of The Covenant Car Company Inc. GM engaged a partnership with The Covenant Car Company, Inc. (TCCCI), appointed by GM Southeast Asia as an independent and exclusive importer and distributor of Chevrolet automobiles and parts in the country. TCCCI was officially incorporated on July 1, 2009, and assumed business operations on October 1, 2009. With the partnership of GM, they launched GM Philippines, Inc. on December 1, 2014. Most of the cars in Chevrolet's lineup were imported from Thailand, the US, and South Korea.

Prior to that, Yutivo Corporation was responsible for the production and manufacturing of General Motors products in the country. Originally founded in 1887, Yutivo was in charge of assembling Chevrolet, Opel, Holden, Vauxhall, Buick, as well as Isuzu cars and trucks for the country. They became a spare parts distributor for General Motors in the country back in 1940. Yutivo started assembly operations in 1953 and stayed in business until 1976. General Motors also built two Asian Utility Vehicles (AUV), called the GM Amigo/Tiger and the GM Harabas. These used the underpinnings of the Bedford HA and a 1256 cc Vauxhall inline-four engine. The Harabas was a four-door station wagon (mainly used as a taxi) and replaced the very basic Amigo/Tiger truck.

Isuzu

Isuzu's Philippine debut came in the 1950s through its line of trucks. In 1972, General Motors and Isuzu formed a joint venture during the 1970s to create GM Philippines. In 1989, Isuzu Motors Pilipinas became a subsidiary of Isuzu Motors Ltd. Since 1995, it was renamed Isuzu Philippines Corporation. Aside from trucks, it also produced SUVs, MPVs, and pick-up trucks such as the Trooper, Hi-Lander (and later, the Crosswind), Fuego, and the D-Max. The company has been exclusively making trucks as they have discontinued producing passenger vehicles, discontinuing the production of the Crosswind in 2017, and the locally made D-Max in 2019, meaning the D-Max would now be imported from Thailand.

Honda
Honda Cars Philippines Inc. (HCPI) was established in October 1990. Under the Philippine government's Car Development Program, production operations commenced in February 1992, in their Santa Rosa, Laguna plant. To date, HCPI is a team of over 600 associates, working with 38 dealers nationwide and about 60 parts and materials suppliers. In March 2020, HCPI announced that it would cease production operations at its plant in Santa Rosa, marking an end to 27 years of production in the country. Since then, cars have been imported into the Philippines from nearby Southeast Asian countries like Thailand and Indonesia.

Hyundai

Hyundai Asia Resources, Inc. (HARI) was the distributor of Hyundai passenger cars and currently the official distributor of Hyundai commercial vehicles in the country. They were appointed by Hyundai Motor Company of South Korea in August 2001 as the official distributor of Hyundai vehicles in the Philippines. It had earned its spot as the third top player in the Philippine automotive industry. But due to the outrage of COVID-19 pandemic, they decided to abandon the passenger car sales which resulted to their sales decline and the numerous of controversies surrounds them even before the pandemic. In late 2020, they launched Changan Motor Philippines, Inc. (CMPI) and became the official distributor of Changan vehicles in the country. HARI has expected sales to be further boosted by its Hyundai Modern Jeepneys with the implementation of the Public Utility Vehicle Modernization Program. HARI targets to sell more modern jeepneys as the government pushes for the Public Utility Vehicle Modernization Program to replace the country's aging jeepneys.

Hyundai Motor Philippines, Inc. (HMPH) is currently the official distributor of Hyundai passenger cars in the country after the company was able to take over operations from HARI in early 2022, Audrey Byun is the CEO, while Lee Dong-wook is the President and Victor Jose Vela is the Deputy General Manager of the company. They started their operations on June 1, 2022, and also, they have unveiled 4 new models, which are the following: the Creta subcompact crossover, the Tucson compact crossover, the Santa Fe mid-size crossover and the Staria passenger van through a dealer conference on June 20, 2022. Meanwhile, the sales of these cars in dealerships began in July 2022.

Hyundai first entered the Philippine market with the Hyundai Excel compact car and the Hyundai Grace van in the early 1990s, later introducing the Hyundai Starex and the second generation Hyundai Elantra towards the end of the decade. Their assembly plant in Santa Rosa, Laguna currently produces the Hyundai Accent, Hyundai H100, and the Hyundai H350. , there are 39 dealerships around the country but it will be expected to increase to 44 by the end of the year. HARI currently focuses on Jeepneys, Trucks and Buses, while HMPH focuses on Cars, SUVs and Passenger Vans.

Kia
Kia Motors began its operation in the Philippines in May 1994 under management of the Columbian Autocar Corporation. It assembled the Kia Pride hatchback and sedans as part of the Car Development Program. It also assembled the Kia Ceres (and the later Kia Besta vans), and the Pregio. Since 2019, Kia Philippines has been managed by the Ayala Corporation.

Mazda
Mazda was introduced into the Philippines in 1993 by Columbian Autocar Corporation. It assembled the 7th and 8th generations of the Mazda 323 (In which both generations were sold alongside each other). In the 2000s, the Mazda3 and the Mazda Tribute were assembled at Ford's Santa Rosa plant under a partnership with Ford Motor Company. Bermaz Auto Philippines is the current importer and distributor of Mazda vehicles in the country and has its own warehouse for storing vehicles located in Cabuyao, Laguna.

Mercedes-Benz
Mercedes-Benz was established in the 1990s under the Luxury Car Program. Prior to that, the brand had been in the country since the 1950s, assembling the Mercedes-Benz Ponton, W110, W114/W115 and the W123 locally. Currently, Auto Nation Group, Inc. (formerly known as CATS Motors, Inc.) is the general importer and distributor of Mercedes-Benz vehicles, parts and accessories in the Philippines. Its history traces back to 1989 when its founder Felix R. Ang opened CATS as a car accessories, tires sales and servicing business. In 1991, Mercedes-Benz appointed CATS Motors as an authorized workshop in the Philippines, and eventually as a dealer in 1993. Auto Nation Group is also responsible for selling Chrysler, Dodge, Jeep, and RAM vehicles in the country.

Mitsubishi

Mitsubishi Motors Philippines was originally established as Chrysler Philippines Corporation in 1963, as the assembler and distributor of Chrysler, Dodge and Plymouth cars in the country. The company was incorporated in 1987 as Philippine Automotive Manufacturing Corporation (PAMCOR). In 1996, the company was renamed Mitsubishi Motors Philippines Corporation (MMPC). Its former assembly plant is located in Cainta, Rizal, operating from 1963 to 2014. Since 2015, its current plant is located in Santa Rosa, Laguna.

In April 2022, MMPC began exporting of the Philippine-made L300 to other Southeast Asian markets.

Nissan

Nissan started in 1969 with the appointment of Universal Motors Corporation (UMC) as the authorized assembler and distributor of Datsun cars and pickups in the country. In 1983, Nissan Motor Company established Pilipinas Nissan, Inc. (PNI) to assemble and distribute Nissan passenger cars. The company was renamed Nissan Motor Philippines, Inc. (NMPI) in 1991. In September 2000, Yulon Motor Co. took control of NMPI from Nissan Motor Company. Since 2013, the brand has been under direct control of Nissan Motor Co, under Nissan Philippines Inc (NPI). In 2021, Nissan Philippines announced that it will shut down its Santa Rosa plant by March, ending local production of the Nissan Almera.

Subaru

In 1996, Columbian Autocar Corporation introduced Subaru to the Philippine market. The brand later withdrew in 2000 due to poor sales but later returned in 2006 under new management. The current official importer and distributor of Subaru vehicles is Motor Image Pilipinas Inc, a subsidiary of Tan Chong International.

Toyota

Established on August 3, 1988, Toyota Motor Philippines is a subsidiary of Toyota Motor Corporation, based in Santa Rosa, Laguna, Philippines. They are responsible for the assembly and distribution of Toyota vehicles in the Philippines since 1988. Since 2009, TMP has also been the official distributor of Lexus cars in the country, operating a dealership in Manila. TMP is the largest automotive company in the country, with the widest vehicle line-up and a sales distribution and service network composed of 72 dealerships nationwide. Prior to that, Toyota vehicles were being sold in the country since 1962 by Delta Motors Corporation. They were responsible for assembling and distributing Toyota vehicles for the Philippine market. Delta Motor Corporation collapsed in 1984, during the Philippine economic downturn of the early 1980s, which meant Toyota was not present in the market for four years.

Volkswagen
Domingo M. Guevarra Sr and his company, DMG Inc. was responsible for importing, producing, and assembling Volkswagens in the Philippines. The Volkswagen Kombi, Beetle and Brasilia were some of the models built by DMG.  DMG was also known for its DMG-Volkswagen Sakbayan, their attempt to build a national car, based on the Australian Volkswagen Country Buggy.
DMG went bankrupt in the mid-80s. Volkswagen later came back in the 1990s, selling the Volkswagen Polo Classic from 1996 until 1999. The Polo Classic, alongside the Caravelle, was locally assembled in Alaminos. In 2013, Volkswagen returned to the Philippine market with the partnership of Ayala Corporation.

In 2018, Volkswagen PH discontinued their international models such as the Jetta, Passat and the Golf GTS in favor of Chinese-sourced models like the Santana, Lavida, and Lamando as part of the new ASEAN-China Free Trade Agreement. The reason for the shift was to reduce tax imposed on the cars by 5%. The decision sparked negativity to the brand, mostly contributed by the South China Sea Arbitration, with Volkswagen reporting low sales in the country - only 177 cars were sold in 2019. Felipe Estrella III, the president of Volkswagen Philippines, emphasizes that "regardless of the source, the product is the same". Currently, the Multivan Kombi  that was launched in the Philippines in July 2021, is the only non-SAIC Volkswagen product in its lineup.

Defunct manufacturers

Daewoo
Daewoo sold moderately in the country until it was forced to pull out due to the Asian Economic Crisis, which led to its bankruptcy and acquisition by GM. Today, many of their cars are sold under the Chevrolet brand. Daewoo Bus still operates and manufactures buses in the country.

Daihatsu

The Daihatsu Feroza was considered a status symbol during its release in the late 1980s, while the Hijet was a popular taxicab. The Daihatsu Charade was also a popular hatchback in the 1990s. Despite its absence, some of their cars today are sold under the Toyota brand. Cars like the Toyota Rush and the Toyota Wigo  were originally Daihatsu models, built in Indonesia.

Fiat
Despite being a bestseller worldwide, the Fiat Uno sold poorly in the country. In mid-2018, Abarth was introduced into the Philippine market selling the Abarth versions of the Fiat 500. Petromax Enterprises, the distributors of the newly introduced brand in the local market, also reintroduced Alfa Romeo into the market, which was last seen in the 1990s.

Lincoln

From 1998 to 2002, Ford Philippines offered the Lincoln Town Car and sold it through its dealerships. It became popular among limousine operators and funeral homes who often converted them into hearses. Currently they import the Lincoln Navigator via grey market.

Opel
Opel, along with Ford, were the two most popular non-Japanese car companies in the 1960s and 1970s. However, the company pulled out of the country after Martial Law was imposed by the Marcos Administration. Opel returned to the Philippines in the mid-1990s with the Astra, Vectra, and Omega, with good sales as a cheap alternative to Japanese cars, but was taken out of the country to make way for Chevrolet's then-brand-new line up (which basically replaced all the cars Opel was selling). An example of this is the Chevrolet Zafira. Despite being an Opel-based car, it was sold alongside the Opel Astra until the brand's discontinuation in the country. Opel Vectras and Astras are still a common sight to see on the roads of Manila, with the Opel Tigra and the Opel Manta is popular among enthusiasts.

Proton

The Malaysian firm Proton only sold the Wira before the Asian Economic Crisis forced them out of the country.

Renault
In the late 1970s, some Renault models were imported into the country. In 1996, a dealership in Metro Manila imported several Renault models. It failed as it was deemed too expensive.

Smart
The lightweight Smart ForTwo city car was supposed to be ideal for Manila's congested roads but failed due to its relatively high price. It remained slightly popular with companies who used them for advertising. The ForTwo and the Roadster were both sold by CATS Motors.

Ssangyong
In the 1990s, SsangYong became popular for their Musso SUV and the Istana-based MB100 van – both of which were marketed as Mercedes-Benz vehicles. The brand pulled out of the Philippine market in 2012. In January 2016, Ssangyong came back into the Philippine Market with their new distributor, Berjaya Group Malaysia.

Vauxhall and Holden

Vauxhall also made cars in the local market during the 1960s. Cars they have sold locally include the Vauxhall Viva and the Vauxhall Victor.

The Australian car manufacturer Holden also assembled a couple of cars in the country during the 1960s and the 1970s, with the Holden Torana being one of the most popular models.

Imported vehicles (Grey market) 

Specialty dealerships across the country import various new vehicles from several countries such as South Korea, the US, and the UAE. In some cases, select authorized dealerships may also use indent orders to import vehicles or trims that are not part of their official inventory. As an example, Ford sold the Lincoln Navigator to a select group of buyers years after the Lincoln brand had been phased out of the market. Some brands can only be acquired through grey import dealers such as Hummer and Cadillac. Due to the popularity of the Cadillac Escalade in the grey import market, GM Philippines considered bringing the brand to the Philippine market, but realized that it would likely fail due to the competitive market for luxury SUVs. US-Market Toyotas such as the Sienna are also imported into the country, as well as the J70 Series Land Cruiser from the Middle East. Despite a Genesis G90 being shown at MIAS in 2017, most Genesis vehicles in the country are sold by grey importers.

In addition, many pre-owned vehicles are imported from Japan, or Hong Kong – countries that use right-hand-drive vehicles on the left side of the road. Because right-hand-drive vehicles are banned in the country, they are converted to left-hand-drive in conversion bays and freeport zones in Subic, Santa Ana, and Toledo. These vehicles are seen with plate numbers R for Subic (Central Luzon), B for Cagayan (Cagayan Valley), K for Cagayan De Oro (Northern Mindanao), and Y for Cebu (Central Visayas). Smuggling of used cars is rampant, with as many as sixty percent of registrations being of cars not officially imported.

Vehicle smuggling

The country made headlines in 2007 when president Gloria Macapagal Arroyo ordered the immediate destruction of 18 luxury vehicles that were illegally smuggled into the country. The cars, which included four BMWs and a Lincoln Navigator, were crushed by backhoes and other heavy construction vehicles at a depot in the Freeport Zone.

Since 2018, there have been a series of public destruction of contraband luxury vehicles under the order of President Rodrigo Duterte as part of an anti-corruption movement in the government. The Bureau of Customs have destroyed illegally smuggled cars worth millions of dollars using backhoes and bulldozers. Cars included Mercedes-Benzes, BMWs, Alpinas, Ferraris, Jaguars, Lamborghinis, Porsches, a C3 Corvette Stingray. The most recent one being a Mclaren 620R. The car was seized in Port of Manila in 2020 and was destroyed a year later in June 2021 along with other vehicles.

Politicians have shown concerns about the destroyed vehicles. Senator Koko Pimentel has suggested that the seized luxury cars should be auctioned to foreign buyers and collectors rather than destroying them, and the profits would then be used to help victims of natural disasters in the Philippines.

Vehicles currently manufactured in the Philippines
Toyota: Vios, Innova

Mitsubishi: L300*, Mirage, Mirage G4Fuso: Fuso Canter, Fuso FK/FL/FM, Fuso FI, Fuso FJ, Rosa, Fuso FP/FV

Hyundai: Accent, H100Hyundai Trucks and Buses: HD36, HD65, HD65X, HD78, Xcient, Super Aero City, Universe

Kia: K2500 Karga

Foton: Toplander, Thunder, View Ambulance, View Transvan, View Traveller, Toano, Gratour MT, Gratour TM, Harabas TM 300, Tornado, Auman Series Trucks

Isuzu Trucks: Q-Series, N-Series, F-Series, C/E-SeriesIsuzu Buses: PABFVR34P, PABFTR33P, LV123, LV423, Mini Bus, NQR, QKR77

Hino Trucks: 300 Series, 500 Series, 700 SeriesHino Buses: RC421(ER200), RF821(EK100), RM2KSS (K13D), RK3HS (H07D), RK1JMT (J08C-TK), RK1JST (J08C-TK), RM2PSS (P11C-TH), RU2PSS (P11C-TE), RK8JMUA (J08E-UB), RK8JSUA (J08E-UB), RN8J (J08E-UB), FB2W, FB4J, FC3J, FC9JL7A (J05E-TY), FF3H (H06D)AK174, (EH700)AK176 (EH700), FG8JPSB (J08E-UG), FG1JPUB (J08C-F), FG1JPUZ (J08C-TT), FG8JPUB (J08E-UG), FG8JP7A (J08E-WF), HT223A (M10U), HT225A (M10U), SH2P, SH1E, SS2P, SS1E

JMC: Hunter, Orion, Vigus, Transporter, Compadre, N700, N720

Daewoo Bus: BV115, BF106, BS106, BH117H, BS120S

Dongfeng: Captain E, Captain N, Captain D9, KD6Z, K04U, K47H, K23W, KW46, TW37, K37F

MAN: TGS, CLA, Lion's Chassis, Lion's City, Lion's Coach, Lion's Intercity

Volkswagen Trucks and Buses: Delivery 9.170, Delivery 11.180, Constellation 14.190, Constellation 17.280 Rigid, Constellation 17.280 Tractor, Constellation 31.280 6x4 Rigid, Volksbus 9.160

(*) - Models for both Domestic and Export markets.

Statistics

Historical sales rank

Sales by brand

See also 
 Economy of the Philippines
 Transportation in the Philippines

References 

History of transportation in the Philippines
 
Motor vehicle manufacturers of the Philippines